Jared Clauss (born April 7, 1981) is a former American football defensive tackle. He was originally drafted by the Tennessee Titans in the seventh round of the 2004 NFL Draft with the 230th overall pick. He played college football at Iowa.

Clauss attended Valley High School in West Des Moines, Iowa.

References

External links
Tennessee Titans bio
Jared Clauss - Hawkeye Sports News

1981 births
Living people
Players of American football from Des Moines, Iowa
Iowa Hawkeyes football players
Tennessee Titans players
Washington Redskins players
Oakland Raiders players